Richard George Adams (9 May 1920 – 24 December 2016) was an English novelist and writer of the books Watership Down, Maia, Shardik and The Plague Dogs. He studied modern history at university before serving in the British Army during World War II. Afterwards, he completed his studies, and then joined the British Civil Service. In 1974, two years after Watership Down was published, Adams became a full-time author.

Early life
Richard Adams was born on 9 May 1920 in Wash Common, near Newbury, Berkshire, England, the son of Lillian Rosa (Button) and Evelyn George Beadon Adams, a doctor. He attended Horris Hill School from 1926 to 1933, and then Bradfield College from 1933 to 1938. In 1938, he went to Worcester College, Oxford, to read Modern History. In July 1940, Adams was called up to join the British Army. He was commissioned into the Royal Army Service Corps and was selected for the Airborne Company, where he worked as a brigade liaison. He served in Palestine, Europe, and East Asia but saw no direct action against either the Germans or the Japanese.

After leaving the army in 1946, Adams returned to Worcester College to continue his studies for a further two years. He received a bachelor's degree in 1948, proceeding MA in 1953. After his graduation in 1948, Adams joined the British Civil Service, rising to the rank of Assistant Secretary to the Ministry of Housing and Local Government, later part of the Department of the Environment. He began to write his own stories in his spare time, reading them to his children and later on, to his grandchildren.

Career
Adams originally began telling the story that would become Watership Down to his two daughters on a car trip. They eventually insisted that he publish it as a book. He began writing in 1966, taking two years to complete it. In 1972, after four publishers and three writers' agencies turned down the manuscript, Rex Collings agreed to publish the work. The book gained international acclaim almost immediately for reinvigorating anthropomorphic fiction with naturalism.

Over the next few years Watership Down sold over a million copies worldwide. Adams won both of the most prestigious British children's book awards, one of six authors to do so: the Carnegie Medal and the Guardian Children's Fiction Prize. In 1974, following publication of his second novel, Shardik, he left the Civil Service to become a full-time author. He was elected a Fellow of the Royal Society of Literature in 1975.

At one point, Adams served as writer-in-residence at the University of Florida and at Hollins University in Virginia. Adams was the recipient of the inaugural Whitchurch Arts Award for inspiration in January 2010, presented at the Watership Down pub in Freefolk, Hampshire. In 2015 he was awarded an honorary doctorate by the University of Winchester.

Public figure
In 1982, Adams served one year as president of the RSPCA. Besides campaigning against furs, Adams wrote The Plague Dogs to satirize animal experimentation (as well as government and tabloid press).  He also made a voyage through the Antarctic in the company of the ornithologist Ronald Lockley. Just before his 90th birthday, he wrote a new story for a charity book, Gentle Footprints, to raise funds for the Born Free Foundation.

Personal life
In 1949, Adams married Elizabeth (Barbara), daughter of R.A.F. Squadron-Leader Edward Fox Dyke Acland, son of the barrister and judge Sir Reginald Brodie Dyke Acland, whose father, the scientist Henry Wentworth Dyke Acland (himself created a baronet of St Mary Magdalen, Oxford) descended from the Acland baronets of Columb John. Until his death, he lived with his wife in Church Street, Whitchurch, within  of his birthplace. Their daughters, to whom Adams originally related the tales that became Watership Down, are Juliet and Rosamond. Adams celebrated his 90th birthday in 2010 with a party at the White Hart in his hometown of Whitchurch, Hampshire, where Sir George Young presented him with a painting by a local artist. Adams wrote a poetic piece celebrating his home of the past 28 years. Adams described himself as an Orthodox Christian.

Adams died on 24 December 2016 at the age of 96 in Oxford, England from complications of a blood disorder.

Works
Watership Down (1972) 
Shardik (1974) 
Nature Through the Seasons (1975) 
The Tyger Voyage (1976) , with Nicola Bayley (reprinted 2013, David R. Godine, Publisher)
The Plague Dogs (1977) 
The Ship's Cat (1977, text of picture book illustrated by Alan Aldridge) 
Nature Day and Night (1978)  (with M. D. Hooper)
The Girl in a Swing (1980) 
The Iron Wolf and Other Stories (1980), published in the US as The Unbroken Web: Stories and Fables. Color Illustrations by Yvonne Gilbert, b&w illustrations by Jennifer Campbell. 
The Legend of Te Tuna (1982), Sylvester & Orphanos, 
Voyage Through the Antarctic (1982 with Ronald Lockley), Allen Lane 
Maia (1984) 
A Nature Diary (1985)  , 
The Bureaucats (1985) , 
Traveller (1988) 
The Day Gone By (autobiography) (1990) 
Tales from Watership Down (collection of linked stories) (1996) 
The Outlandish Knight (1999) 
Daniel (2006) 
"Leopard Aware" in Gentle Footprints (2010)

Notes

References

External links

Richard Adams at Wrecking Ball Press
Richard Adams' Desert Island Discs appearance - 5 November 1977

1920 births
2016 deaths
20th-century English novelists
21st-century English novelists
Alumni of Worcester College, Oxford
British Army personnel of World War II
Carnegie Medal in Literature winners
Constructed language creators
English children's writers
English fantasy writers
Fellows of the Royal Society of Literature
Guardian Children's Fiction Prize winners
People educated at Bradfield College
People from Newbury, Berkshire
People associated with Sandleford, Berkshire
University of Florida faculty
Writers from Berkshire
Military personnel from Berkshire
Royal Army Service Corps officers
Civil servants in the Ministry of Housing and Local Government
Civil servants in the Department of the Environment
British expatriates in Mandatory Palestine
British expatriates in the United States